The Leopaard CS3 is a five-door subcompact crossover electric crossover SUV produced by Changfeng Motor of GAC Group under the Leopaard brand.

Overview

The Leopaard CS3 was originally launched as a concept during the 2018 Beijing Auto Show, and was introduced again during the 2019 Shanghai Auto Show as a prototype with the Chinese name Bingge (缤歌) being revealed at the same time. The CS3 BEV is powered by a 68hp (50kW) permanent magnet motor, and in equipped with a battery with a capacity of 30.8kWh. The electric range tested by NEDC is 305km.

See also

 Chevrolet Bolt
 Xpeng G3
 BYD Yuan

References

External links
Leopaard brand official website

Crossover sport utility vehicles
Front-wheel-drive vehicles
2010s cars
Changfeng Motor vehicles
Electric concept cars
Cars introduced in 2018